Clayburgh is a surname. Notable people with the surname include:

Ben Clayburgh (1924–2013), American politician
Jill Clayburgh (1944–2010), American actress
Jim Clayburgh (born 1949), American theater director
Rick Clayburgh (born 1960), American politician